Microphthalmia–dermal aplasia–sclerocornea syndrome  is a condition characterized by linear skin lesions. MLS is a rare X-linked dominant male-lethal disease characterized by unilateral or bilateral microphthalmia and linear skin defects in affected females, and in utero lethality for affected males. It can be associated with HCCS, mutations in it cause microphthalmia with Linear Skin Defects Syndrome.

See also 
 List of cutaneous conditions

References

External links 

GeneReview/NIH/UW entry on Microphthalmia with Linear Skin Defects Syndrome

Genodermatoses
Syndromes